Dwight David "Ike" Eisenhower (born David Dwight Eisenhower; October 14, 1890 – March 28, 1969) was an American military officer and statesman who served as the 34th president of the United States from 1953 to 1961. During World War II, he served as Supreme Commander of the Allied Expeditionary Force in Europe and achieved the five-star rank as General of the Army. Eisenhower planned and supervised two of the most consequential military campaigns of World War II,  Operation Torch in the North Africa campaign in 1942–1943 and the D-Day invasion of Normandy in 1945.

Eisenhower was born into a large family of mostly Pennsylvania Dutch ancestry in Denison, Texas, and raised in Abilene, Kansas. His family had a strong religious background, and his mother became a Jehovah's Witness. Eisenhower, however, belonged to no organized church until 1952. He graduated from West Point in 1915 and later married Mamie Doud, with whom he had two sons. During World War I, he was denied a request to serve in Europe and instead commanded a unit that trained tank crews. Following the war, he served under various generals and was promoted to the rank of brigadier general in 1941. After the United States entered World War II, Eisenhower oversaw the invasions of North Africa and Sicily before supervising the invasions of France and Germany. After the war, he served as Army Chief of Staff (1945–1948), as president of Columbia University (1948–1953), and as the first Supreme Commander of NATO (1951–1952).

In 1952, Eisenhower entered the presidential race as a Republican to block the isolationist foreign policies of Senator Robert A. Taft, who opposed NATO and wanted no foreign entanglements. Eisenhower won that election and the 1956 election in landslides, both times defeating Adlai Stevenson II. Eisenhower's main goals in office were to contain the spread of communism and reduce federal deficits. In 1953, he considered using nuclear weapons to end the Korean War and may have threatened China with nuclear attack if an armistice was not reached quickly. China did agree and an armistice resulted, which remains in effect. His New Look policy of nuclear deterrence prioritized "inexpensive" nuclear weapons while reducing funding for expensive Army divisions. He continued Harry S. Truman's policy of recognizing Taiwan as the legitimate government of China, and he won congressional approval of the Formosa Resolution. His administration provided major aid to help the French fight off Vietnamese Communists in the First Indochina War. After the French left, he gave strong financial support to the new state of South Vietnam. He supported regime-changing military coups in Iran and Guatemala orchestrated by his own administration. During the Suez Crisis of 1956, he condemned the Israeli, British, and French invasion of Egypt, and he forced them to withdraw. He also condemned the Soviet invasion during the Hungarian Revolution of 1956 but took no action. He deployed 15,000 soldiers during the 1958 Lebanon crisis. Near the end of his term, a summit meeting with the Soviet leader Nikita Khrushchev was cancelled when a U.S. spy plane was shot down over the Soviet Union. Eisenhower approved the Bay of Pigs Invasion, which was left to John F. Kennedy to carry out.

On the domestic front, Eisenhower governed as a moderate conservative who continued New Deal agencies and expanded Social Security. He covertly opposed Joseph McCarthy and contributed to the end of McCarthyism by openly invoking executive privilege. He signed the Civil Rights Act of 1957 and sent Army troops to enforce federal court orders which integrated schools in Little Rock, Arkansas. His administration undertook the development and construction of the Interstate Highway System, which remains the largest construction of roadways in American history. In 1957, following the Soviet launch of Sputnik, Eisenhower led the American response which included the creation of NASA and the establishment of a stronger, science-based education via the National Defense Education Act. Following the establishment of NASA, the Soviet Union began to reinforce their own space program, escalating the Space Race. His two terms saw unprecedented economic prosperity except for a minor recession in 1958. In his farewell address to the nation, he expressed his concerns about the dangers of massive military spending, particularly deficit spending and government contracts to private military manufacturers, which he dubbed "the military–industrial complex". Historical evaluations of his presidency place him among the upper tier of American presidents.

Family background 

The Eisenhauer (German for "iron hewer or "iron miner") family migrated from the German village of Karlsbrunn to the Province of Pennsylvania in 1741, initially settling in York, Pennsylvania. The family moved to Kansas in the 1880s. Accounts vary as to how and when the German name Eisenhauer was anglicized to Eisenhower. Eisenhower's Pennsylvania Dutch ancestors, who were primarily farmers, included Hans Nikolaus Eisenhauer of Karlsbrunn, who migrated in 1741 to Lancaster, Pennsylvania.

Hans's great-great-grandson, David Jacob Eisenhower (1863–1942), Eisenhower's father, was a college-educated engineer, despite his own father Jacob's urging to stay on the family farm. Eisenhower's mother, Ida Elizabeth (Stover) Eisenhower, born in Virginia, of predominantly German Protestant ancestry, moved to Kansas from Virginia. She married David on September 23, 1885, in Lecompton, Kansas, on the campus of their alma mater, Lane University. Dwight David Eisenhower's lineage also included English ancestors (on both sides) and Scottish ancestors (through his maternal line).

David owned a general store in Hope, Kansas, but the business failed due to economic conditions and the family became impoverished. The Eisenhowers then lived in Texas from 1889 until 1892, and later returned to Kansas, with $24 to their name at the time. David worked as a railroad mechanic and then at a creamery. By 1898, the parents made a decent living and provided a suitable home for their large family.

Early life and education 

Eisenhower was born David Dwight Eisenhower in Denison, Texas, on October 14, 1890, the third of seven sons born to Ida Stover and David J. Eisenhower. His mother soon reversed his two forenames after his birth to avoid the confusion of having two Davids in the family. All of the boys were nicknamed "Ike", such as "Big Ike" (Edgar) and "Little Ike" (Eisenhower); the nickname was intended as an abbreviation of their last name. By World War II, only Eisenhower was still called "Ike".

In 1892, the family moved to Abilene, Kansas, which Eisenhower considered his hometown. As a child, he was involved in an accident that cost his younger brother Earl an eye, for which he was remorseful for the remainder of his life. Eisenhower developed a keen and enduring interest in exploring the outdoors. He learned about hunting and fishing, cooking, and card playing from an illiterate man named Bob Davis who camped on the Smoky Hill River. While his mother was against war, it was her collection of history books that first sparked Eisenhower's early and lasting interest in military history. He persisted in reading the books in her collection and became a voracious reader on the subject. Other favorite subjects early in his education were arithmetic and spelling.

His parents set aside specific times at breakfast and at dinner for daily family Bible reading. Chores were regularly assigned and rotated among all the children, and misbehavior was met with unequivocal discipline, usually from David. His mother, previously a member (with David) of the River Brethren sect of the Mennonites, joined the International Bible Students Association, later known as Jehovah's Witnesses. The Eisenhower home served as the local meeting hall from 1896 to 1915, though Eisenhower never joined the International Bible Students. His later decision to attend West Point saddened his mother, who felt that warfare was "rather wicked", but she did not overrule his decision. While speaking of himself in 1948, Eisenhower said he was "one of the most deeply religious men I know" though unattached to any "sect or organization". He was baptized in the Presbyterian Church in 1953.

Eisenhower attended Abilene High School and graduated with the class of 1909. As a freshman, he injured his knee and developed a leg infection that extended into his groin, which his doctor diagnosed as life-threatening. The doctor insisted that the leg be amputated but Dwight refused to allow it, and surprisingly recovered, though he had to repeat his freshman year. He and brother Edgar both wanted to attend college, though they lacked the funds. They made a pact to take alternate years at college while the other worked to earn the tuitions.

Edgar took the first turn at school, and Dwight was employed as a night supervisor at the Belle Springs Creamery. When Edgar asked for a second year, Dwight consented and worked for a second year. At that time, a friend Edward "Swede" Hazlett was applying to the Naval Academy and urged Dwight to apply to the school, since no tuition was required. Eisenhower requested consideration for either Annapolis or West Point with his U.S. Senator, Joseph L. Bristow. Though Eisenhower was among the winners of the entrance-exam competition, he was beyond the age limit for the Naval Academy. He then accepted an appointment to West Point in 1911.

At West Point, Eisenhower relished the emphasis on traditions and on sports, but was less enthusiastic about the hazing, though he willingly accepted it as a plebe. He was also a regular violator of the more detailed regulations and finished school with a less than stellar discipline rating. Academically, Eisenhower's best subject by far was English. Otherwise, his performance was average, though he thoroughly enjoyed the typical emphasis of engineering on science and mathematics.

In athletics, Eisenhower later said that "not making the baseball team at West Point was one of the greatest disappointments of my life, maybe my greatest". He made the varsity football team and was a starter at halfback in 1912, when he tried to tackle the legendary Jim Thorpe of the Carlisle Indians. Eisenhower suffered a torn knee while being tackled in the next game, which was the last he played; he reinjured his knee on horseback and in the boxing ring, so he turned to fencing and gymnastics.

Eisenhower later served as junior varsity football coach and cheerleader, which caught the attention of General Frederick Funston. He graduated from West Point in the middle of the class of 1915, which became known as "the class the stars fell on", because 59 members eventually became general officers. After graduation in 1915, Second Lieutenant Eisenhower requested an assignment in the Philippines, which was denied; because of the ongoing Mexican Revolution, he was instead posted to Fort Sam Houston in San Antonio, Texas, under the command of General Funston. In 1916, while stationed at Fort Sam Houston, Eisenhower was convinced by Funston to become the football coach for Peacock Military Academy, and later became the coach at St. Louis College, now St. Mary's University; Eisenhower was an honorary member of the Sigma Beta Chi fraternity at St. Mary's University.

Personal life 

While Eisenhower was stationed in Texas, he met Mamie Doud of Boone, Iowa. They were immediately taken with each other. He proposed to her on Valentine's Day in 1916. A November wedding date in Denver was moved up to July 1 due to the impending U.S. entry into World War I; Funston approved 10 days of leave for their wedding. The Eisenhowers moved many times during their first 35 years of marriage.

The Eisenhowers had two sons. In late 1917 while he was in charge of training at Fort Oglethorpe in Georgia, his wife Mamie had their first son, Doud Dwight "Icky" Eisenhower (1917–1921), who died of scarlet fever at the age of three. Eisenhower was mostly reluctant to discuss his death. Their second son, John Eisenhower (1922–2013), was born in Denver, Colorado. John served in the United States Army, retired as a brigadier general, became an author and served as U.S. Ambassador to Belgium from 1969 to 1971. Coincidentally, John graduated from West Point on D-Day, June 6, 1944. He married Barbara Jean Thompson on June 10, 1947. John and Barbara had four children: David, Barbara Ann, Susan Elaine and Mary Jean. David, after whom Camp David is named, married Richard Nixon's daughter Julie in 1968.

Eisenhower was a golf enthusiast later in life, and he joined the Augusta National Golf Club in 1948. He played golf frequently during and after his presidency and was unreserved in expressing his passion for the game, to the point of golfing during winter; he ordered his golf balls painted black so he could see them better against snow on the ground. He had a small, basic golf facility installed at Camp David, and he became close friends with the Augusta National Chairman Clifford Roberts, inviting Roberts to stay at the White House on numerous occasions. Roberts, an investment broker, also handled the Eisenhower family's investments.

Oil painting was one of Eisenhower's hobbies. He began painting while at Columbia University, after watching Thomas E. Stephens paint Mamie's portrait. In order to relax, Eisenhower painted about 260 oils during the last 20 years of his life. The images were mostly landscapes but also portraits of subjects such as Mamie, their grandchildren, General Montgomery, George Washington, and Abraham Lincoln. Wendy Beckett stated that Eisenhower's paintings, "simple and earnest," caused her to "wonder at the hidden depths of this reticent president". A conservative in both art and politics, Eisenhower in a 1962 speech denounced modern art as "a piece of canvas that looks like a broken-down Tin Lizzie, loaded with paint, has been driven over it".

Angels in the Outfield was Eisenhower's favorite movie. His favorite reading material for relaxation were the Western novels of Zane Grey. With his excellent memory and ability to focus, Eisenhower was skilled at card games. He learned poker, which he called his "favorite indoor sport", in Abilene. Eisenhower recorded West Point classmates' poker losses for payment after graduation and later stopped playing because his opponents resented having to pay him. A friend reported that after learning to play contract bridge at West Point, Eisenhower played the game six nights a week for five months. Eisenhower continued to play bridge throughout his military career. While stationed in the Philippines, he played regularly with President Manuel Quezon, earning him the nickname the "Bridge Wizard of Manila". During WWII, an unwritten qualification for an officer's appointment to Eisenhower's staff was the ability to play a sound game of bridge. He played even during the stressful weeks leading up to the D-Day landings. His favorite partner was General Alfred Gruenther, considered the best player in the U.S. Army; he appointed Gruenther his second-in-command at NATO partly because of his skill at bridge. Saturday night bridge games at the White House were a feature of his presidency. He was a strong player, though not an expert by modern standards. The great bridge player and popularizer Ely Culbertson described his game as classic and sound with "flashes of brilliance" and said that "you can always judge a man's character by the way he plays cards. Eisenhower is a calm and collected player and never whines at his losses. He is brilliant in victory but never commits the bridge player's worst crime of gloating when he wins." Bridge expert Oswald Jacoby frequently participated in the White House games and said, "The President plays better bridge than golf. He tries to break 90 at golf. At bridge, you would say he plays in the 70s."

World War I (1914–1918) 

Eisenhower served initially in logistics and then the infantry at various camps in Texas and Georgia until 1918. When the U.S. entered World War I, he immediately requested an overseas assignment but was again denied and then assigned to Ft. Leavenworth, Kansas. In February 1918, he was transferred to Camp Meade in Maryland with the 65th Engineers. His unit was later ordered to France, but, to his chagrin, he received orders for the new tank corps, where he was promoted to brevet lieutenant colonel in the National Army. He commanded a unit that trained tank crews at Camp Colt – his first command – at the site of "Pickett's Charge" on the Gettysburg Civil War battleground. Though Eisenhower and his tank crews never saw combat, he displayed excellent organizational skills as well as an ability to accurately assess junior officers' strengths and make optimal placements of personnel.

Once again his spirits were raised when the unit under his command received orders overseas to France. This time his wishes were thwarted when the armistice was signed a week before his departure date. Completely missing out on the warfront left him depressed and bitter for a time, despite receiving the Distinguished Service Medal for his work at home. In World War II, rivals who had combat service in the Great War (led by Gen. Bernard Montgomery) sought to denigrate Eisenhower for his previous lack of combat duty, despite his stateside experience establishing a camp, completely equipped, for thousands of troops and developing a full combat training schedule.

In service of generals 

After the war, Eisenhower reverted to his regular rank of captain and a few days later was promoted to major, a rank he held for 16 years. The major was assigned in 1919 to a transcontinental Army convoy to test vehicles and dramatize the need for improved roads in the nation. Indeed, the convoy averaged only  from Washington, D.C. to San Francisco; later the improvement of highways became a signature issue for Eisenhower as president.

He assumed duties again at Camp Meade, Maryland, commanding a battalion of tanks, where he remained until 1922. His schooling continued, focused on the nature of the next war and the role of the tank in it. His new expertise in tank warfare was strengthened by a close collaboration with George S. Patton, Sereno E. Brett, and other senior tank leaders. Their leading-edge ideas of speed-oriented offensive tank warfare were strongly discouraged by superiors, who considered the new approach too radical and preferred to continue using tanks in a strictly supportive role for the infantry. Eisenhower was even threatened with court-martial for continued publication of these proposed methods of tank deployment, and he relented.

From 1920, Eisenhower served under a succession of talented generals – Fox Conner, John J. Pershing, Douglas MacArthur and George Marshall. He first became executive officer to General Conner in the Panama Canal Zone, where, joined by Mamie, he served until 1924. Under Conner's tutelage, he studied military history and theory (including Carl von Clausewitz's On War), and later cited Conner's enormous influence on his military thinking, saying in 1962 that "Fox Conner was the ablest man I ever knew." Conner's comment on Eisenhower was, "[He] is one of the most capable, efficient and loyal officers I have ever met." On Conner's recommendation, in 1925–1926 he attended the Command and General Staff College at Fort Leavenworth, Kansas, where he graduated first in a class of 245 officers. He then served as a battalion commander at Fort Benning, Georgia, until 1927.

During the late 1920s and early 1930s, Eisenhower's career in the post-war army stalled somewhat, as military priorities diminished; many of his friends resigned for high-paying business jobs. He was assigned to the American Battle Monuments Commission directed by General Pershing, and with the help of his brother Milton Eisenhower, then a journalist at the U.S. Agriculture Department, he produced a guide to American battlefields in Europe. He then was assigned to the Army War College and graduated in 1928. After a one-year assignment in France, Eisenhower served as executive officer to General George V. Moseley, Assistant Secretary of War, from 1929 to February 1933. Major Dwight D. Eisenhower graduated from the Army Industrial College (Washington, DC) in 1933 and later served on the faculty (it was later expanded to become the Industrial College of the Armed Services and is now known as the Dwight D. Eisenhower School for National Security and Resource Strategy).

His primary duty was planning for the next war, which proved most difficult in the midst of the Great Depression. He then was posted as chief military aide to General Douglas MacArthur, Army Chief of Staff. In 1932, he participated in the clearing of the Bonus March encampment in Washington, D.C. Although he was against the actions taken against the veterans and strongly advised MacArthur against taking a public role in it, he later wrote the Army's official incident report, endorsing MacArthur's conduct.

Philippine tenure
In 1935, he accompanied MacArthur to the Philippines, where he served as assistant military adviser to the Philippine government in developing their army. MacArthur allowed Eisenhower to handpick an officer whom he thought would contribute much to the mission. Hence he chose James Ord, a fellow classmate of him at West Point Academy. Having been brought up in Mexico, which inculcated into him the Spanish culture in which both the Mexico and the Philippines had similarities, Ord was deemed as the right pick for the job. Eisenhower had strong philosophical disagreements with MacArthur regarding the role of the Philippine Army and the leadership qualities that an American army officer should exhibit and develop in his subordinates. The antipathy between Eisenhower and MacArthur lasted the rest of their lives.

After quite some time, on December of 1935, after realizing that the mission of constructing a well-sound plan for the creation of the Philippine Army was very lagging behind, his optimistic character turned into a bleak state, all the more when in 1936, Eisenhower was entrusted with the responsibility of finding the right officer who would train the fresh recruits; there was simply not enough manpower for potential instructors. 

Historians have concluded that this assignment provided valuable preparation for handling the challenging personalities of Winston Churchill, George S. Patton, George Marshall, and Bernard Montgomery during World War II. Eisenhower later emphasized that too much had been made of the disagreements with MacArthur and that a positive relationship endured. While in Manila, Mamie suffered a life-threatening stomach ailment but recovered fully. Eisenhower was promoted to the rank of permanent lieutenant colonel in 1936. He also learned to fly, making a solo flight over the Philippines in 1937, and obtained his private pilot's license in 1939 at Fort Lewis. Also around this time, he was offered a post by the Philippine Commonwealth Government, namely by then Philippine President Manuel L. Quezon on recommendations by MacArthur, to become the chief of police of a new capital being planned, now named Quezon City, but he declined the offer.

Eisenhower returned to the United States in December 1939 and was assigned as commanding officer (CO) of the 1st Battalion, 15th Infantry Regiment at Fort Lewis, Washington, later becoming the regimental executive officer. In March 1941 he was promoted to colonel and assigned as chief of staff of the newly activated IX Corps under Major General Kenyon Joyce. In June 1941, he was appointed chief of staff to General Walter Krueger, Commander of the Third Army, at Fort Sam Houston in San Antonio, Texas. After successfully participating in the Louisiana Maneuvers, he was promoted to brigadier general on October 3, 1941. Although his administrative abilities had been noticed, on the eve of the American entry into World War II he had never held an active command above a battalion and was far from being considered by many as a potential commander of major operations.

World War II (1939–1945) 
After the  Japanese attack on Pearl Harbor, Eisenhower was assigned to the General Staff in Washington, where he served until June 1942 with responsibility for creating the major war plans to defeat Japan and Germany. He was appointed Deputy Chief in charge of Pacific Defenses under the Chief of War Plans Division (WPD), General Leonard T. Gerow, and then succeeded Gerow as Chief of the War Plans Division. Next, he was appointed Assistant Chief of Staff in charge of the new Operations Division (which replaced WPD) under Chief of Staff General George C. Marshall, who spotted talent and promoted accordingly.

At the end of May 1942, Eisenhower accompanied Lt. Gen. Henry H. Arnold, commanding general of the Army Air Forces, to London to assess the effectiveness of the theater commander in England, Maj. Gen. James E. Chaney. He returned to Washington on June 3 with a pessimistic assessment, stating he had an "uneasy feeling" about Chaney and his staff. On June 23, 1942, he returned to London as Commanding General, European Theater of Operations (ETOUSA), based in London and with a house on Coombe, Kingston upon Thames, and took over command of ETOUSA from Chaney. He was promoted to lieutenant general on July 7.

Operations Torch and Avalanche 

In November 1942, Eisenhower was also appointed Supreme Commander Allied Expeditionary Force of the North African Theater of Operations (NATOUSA) through the new operational Headquarters Allied (Expeditionary) Force Headquarters (A(E)FHQ). The word "expeditionary" was dropped soon after his appointment for security reasons. The campaign in North Africa was designated Operation Torch and was planned in the underground headquarters within the Rock of Gibraltar. Eisenhower was the first non-British person to command Gibraltar in 200 years.

French cooperation was deemed necessary to the campaign and Eisenhower encountered a "preposterous situation" with the multiple rival factions in France. His primary objective was to move forces successfully into Tunisia and intending to facilitate that objective, he gave his support to François Darlan as High Commissioner in North Africa, despite Darlan's previous high offices of state in Vichy France and his continued role as commander-in-chief of the French armed forces. The Allied leaders were "thunderstruck" by this from a political standpoint, though none of them had offered Eisenhower guidance with the problem in the course of planning the operation. Eisenhower was severely criticized for the move. Darlan was assassinated on December 24 by 
Fernand Bonnier de La Chapelle, a French antifascist monarchist. Eisenhower later appointed, as High Commissioner, General Henri Giraud, who had been installed by the Allies as Darlan's commander-in-chief.

Operation Torch also served as a valuable training ground for Eisenhower's combat command skills; during the initial phase of Generalfeldmarschall Erwin Rommel's move into the Kasserine Pass, Eisenhower created some confusion in the ranks by some interference with the execution of battle plans by his subordinates. He also was initially indecisive in his removal of Lloyd Fredendall, commanding U.S. II Corps. He became more adroit in such matters in later campaigns. In February 1943, his authority was extended as commander of AFHQ across the Mediterranean basin to include the British Eighth Army, commanded by General Sir Bernard Montgomery. The Eighth Army had advanced across the Western Desert from the east and was ready for the start of the Tunisia Campaign. Eisenhower gained his fourth star and gave up command of ETOUSA to become commander of NATOUSA.

After the capitulation of Axis forces in North Africa, Eisenhower oversaw the invasion of Sicily. Once Mussolini, the Italian leader, had fallen in Italy, the Allies switched their attention to the mainland with Operation Avalanche. But while Eisenhower argued with President  Roosevelt and British Prime Minister Churchill, who both insisted on unconditional terms of surrender in exchange for helping the Italians, the Germans pursued an aggressive buildup of forces in the country. The Germans made the already tough battle more difficult by adding 19 divisions and initially outnumbering the Allied forces 2 to 1.

Supreme Allied commander and Operation Overlord 
In December 1943, President Roosevelt decided that Eisenhower – not Marshall – would be Supreme Allied Commander in Europe. The following month, he resumed command of ETOUSA and the following month was officially designated as the Supreme Allied Commander of the Allied Expeditionary Force (SHAEF), serving in a dual role until the end of hostilities in Europe in May 1945. He was charged in these positions with planning and carrying out the Allied assault on the coast of Normandy in June 1944 under the code name Operation Overlord, the liberation of Western Europe and the invasion of Germany.

Eisenhower, as well as the officers and troops under him, had learned valuable lessons in their previous operations, and their skills had all strengthened in preparation for the next most difficult campaign against the Germans—a beach landing assault. His first struggles, however, were with Allied leaders and officers on matters vital to the success of the Normandy invasion; he argued with Roosevelt over an essential agreement with De Gaulle to use French resistance forces in covert and sabotage operations against the Germans in advance of Operation Overlord. Admiral Ernest J. King fought with Eisenhower over King's refusal to provide additional landing craft from the Pacific. Eisenhower also insisted that the British give him exclusive command over all strategic air forces to facilitate Overlord, to the point of threatening to resign unless Churchill relented, which he did. Eisenhower then designed a bombing plan in France in advance of Overlord and argued with Churchill over the latter's concern with civilian casualties; de Gaulle interjected that the casualties were justified in shedding the yoke of the Germans, and Eisenhower prevailed. He also had to skillfully manage to retain the services of the often unruly George S. Patton, by severely reprimanding him when Patton earlier had slapped a subordinate, and then when Patton gave a speech in which he made improper comments about postwar policy.

The D-Day Normandy landings on June 6, 1944, were costly but successful. Two months later (August 15), the invasion of Southern France took place, and control of forces in the southern invasion passed from the AFHQ to the SHAEF. Many thought that victory in Europe would come by summer's end, but the Germans did not capitulate for almost a year. From then until the end of the war in Europe on May 8, 1945, Eisenhower, through SHAEF, commanded all Allied forces, and through his command of ETOUSA had administrative command of all U.S. forces on the Western Front north of the Alps. He was ever mindful of the inevitable loss of life and suffering that would be experienced on an individual level by the troops under his command and their families. This prompted him to make a point of visiting every division involved in the invasion. Eisenhower's sense of responsibility was underscored by his draft of a statement to be issued if the invasion failed. It has been called one of the great speeches of history:

Our landings in the Cherbourg-Havre area have failed to gain a satisfactory foothold and I have withdrawn the troops. My decision to attack at this time and place was based on the best information available. The troops, the air and the Navy did all that bravery and devotion to duty could do. If any blame or fault attaches to the attempt, it is mine alone.

Liberation of France and victory in Europe 

Once the coastal assault had succeeded, Eisenhower insisted on retaining personal control over the land battle strategy, and was immersed in the command and supply of multiple assaults through France on Germany. Field Marshal Montgomery insisted priority be given to his 21st Army Group's attack being made in the north, while Generals Bradley (12th U.S. Army Group) and Devers (Sixth U.S. Army Group) insisted they be given priority in the center and south of the front (respectively). Eisenhower worked tirelessly to address the demands of the rival commanders to optimize Allied forces, often by giving them tactical latitude; many historians conclude this delayed the Allied victory in Europe. However, due to Eisenhower's persistence, the pivotal supply port at Antwerp was successfully, albeit belatedly, opened in late 1944.

In recognition of his senior position in the Allied command, on December 20, 1944, he was promoted to General of the Army, equivalent to the rank of Field Marshal in most European armies. In this and the previous high commands he held, Eisenhower showed his great talents for leadership and diplomacy. Although he had never seen action himself, he won the respect of front-line commanders. He interacted adeptly with allies such as Winston Churchill, Field Marshal Bernard Montgomery and General Charles de Gaulle. He had serious disagreements with Churchill and Montgomery over questions of strategy, but these rarely upset his relationships with them. He dealt with Soviet Marshal Zhukov, his Russian counterpart, and they became good friends.

In December 1944, the Germans launched a surprise counteroffensive, the Battle of the Bulge, which the Allies turned back in early 1945 after Eisenhower repositioned his armies and improved weather allowed the Army Air Force to engage. German defenses continued to deteriorate on both the Eastern Front with the Red Army and the Western Front with the Western Allies. The British wanted to capture Berlin, but Eisenhower decided it would be a military mistake for him to attack Berlin, and said orders to that effect would have to be explicit. The British backed down but then wanted Eisenhower to move into Czechoslovakia for political reasons. Washington refused to support Churchill's plan to use Eisenhower's army for political maneuvers against Moscow. The actual division of Germany followed the lines that Roosevelt, Churchill and Stalin had previously agreed upon. The Soviet Red Army captured Berlin in a very large-scale bloody battle, and the Germans finally surrendered on May 7, 1945.

In 1945, Eisenhower anticipated that someday an attempt would be made to recharacterize Nazi crimes as propaganda (Holocaust denial) and took steps against it by demanding extensive still and movie photographic documentation of Nazi death camps.

After World War II (1945–1953)

Military Governor in Germany and Army Chief of Staff 

Following the German unconditional surrender, Eisenhower was appointed military governor of the American occupation zone, located primarily in Southern Germany, and headquartered at the IG Farben Building in Frankfurt am Main. Upon discovery of the Nazi concentration camps, he ordered camera crews to document evidence of the atrocities in them for use in the Nuremberg Trials. He reclassified German prisoners of war (POWs) in U.S. custody as Disarmed Enemy Forces (DEFs), who were no longer subject to the Geneva Convention. Eisenhower followed the orders laid down by the Joint Chiefs of Staff (JCS) in directive JCS 1067 but softened them by bringing in 400,000 tons of food for civilians and allowing more fraternization. In response to the devastation in Germany, including food shortages and an influx of refugees, he arranged distribution of American food and medical equipment. His actions reflected the new American attitudes of the German people as Nazi victims not villains, while aggressively purging the ex-Nazis.

In November 1945, Eisenhower returned to Washington to replace Marshall as Chief of Staff of the Army. His main role was the rapid demobilization of millions of soldiers, a job that was delayed by lack of shipping. Eisenhower was convinced in 1946 that the Soviet Union did not want war and that friendly relations could be maintained; he strongly supported the new United Nations and favored its involvement in the control of atomic bombs. However, in formulating policies regarding the atomic bomb and relations with the Soviets, Truman was guided by the U.S. State Department and ignored Eisenhower and the Pentagon. Indeed, Eisenhower had opposed the use of the atomic bomb against the Japanese, writing, "First, the Japanese were ready to surrender and it wasn't necessary to hit them with that awful thing. Second, I hated to see our country be the first to use such a weapon." Initially, Eisenhower hoped for cooperation with the Soviets. He even visited Warsaw in 1945. Invited by Bolesław Bierut and decorated with the highest military decoration, he was shocked by the scale of destruction in the city. However, by mid-1947, as east–west tensions over economic recovery in Germany and the Greek Civil War escalated, Eisenhower agreed with a containment policy to stop Soviet expansion.

1948 presidential election 
In June 1943, a visiting politician had suggested to Eisenhower that he might become President of the United States after the war. Believing that a general should not participate in politics, Merlo J. Pusey wrote that "figuratively speaking, [Eisenhower] kicked his political-minded visitor out of his office". As others asked him about his political future, Eisenhower told one that he could not imagine wanting to be considered for any political job "from dogcatcher to Grand High Supreme King of the Universe", and another that he could not serve as Army Chief of Staff if others believed he had political ambitions. In 1945, Truman told Eisenhower during the Potsdam Conference that if desired, the president would help the general win the 1948 election, and in 1947 he offered to run as Eisenhower's running mate on the Democratic ticket if MacArthur won the Republican nomination.

As the election approached, other prominent citizens and politicians from both parties urged Eisenhower to run for president. In January 1948, after learning of plans in New Hampshire to elect delegates supporting him for the forthcoming Republican National Convention, Eisenhower stated through the Army that he was "not available for and could not accept nomination to high political office"; "life-long professional soldiers", he wrote, "in the absence of some obvious and overriding reason, [should] abstain from seeking high political office". Eisenhower maintained no political party affiliation during this time. Many believed he was forgoing his only opportunity to be president as Republican Thomas E. Dewey was considered the probable winner and would presumably serve two terms, meaning that Eisenhower, at age 66 in 1956, would be too old to have another chance to run.

President at Columbia University and NATO Supreme Commander 

In 1948, Eisenhower became President of Columbia University, an Ivy League university in New York City, where he was inducted into Phi Beta Kappa. The choice was subsequently characterized as not having been a good fit for either party. During that year, Eisenhower's memoir, Crusade in Europe, was published. Critics regarded it as one of the finest U.S. military memoirs, and it was a major financial success as well. Eisenhower sought the advice of Augusta National's Roberts about the tax implications of this, and in due course Eisenhower's profit on the book was substantially aided by what author David Pietrusza calls "a ruling without precedent" by the U.S. Department of the Treasury.  It held that Eisenhower was not a professional writer, but rather, marketing the lifetime asset of his experiences, and thus he had to pay only capital gains tax on his $635,000 advance instead of the much higher personal tax rate. This ruling saved Eisenhower about $400,000.

Eisenhower's stint as the president of Columbia University was punctuated by his activity within the Council on Foreign Relations, a study group he led as president concerning the political and military implications of the Marshall Plan, and The American Assembly, Eisenhower's "vision of a great cultural center where business, professional and governmental leaders could meet from time to time to discuss and reach conclusions concerning problems of a social and political nature". His biographer Blanche Wiesen Cook suggested that this period served as "the political education of General Eisenhower", since he had to prioritize wide-ranging educational, administrative, and financial demands for the university. Through his involvement in the Council on Foreign Relations, he also gained exposure to economic analysis, which would become the bedrock of his understanding in economic policy. "Whatever General Eisenhower knows about economics, he has learned at the study group meetings," one Aid to Europe member claimed.

Eisenhower accepted the presidency of the university to expand his ability to promote "the American form of democracy" through education. He was clear on this point to the trustees involved in the search committee. He informed them that his main purpose was "to promote the basic concepts of education in a democracy". As a result, he was "almost incessantly" devoted to the idea of the American Assembly, a concept he developed into an institution by the end of 1950.

Within months of beginning his tenure as the president of the university, Eisenhower was requested to advise U.S. Secretary of Defense James Forrestal on the unification of the armed services. About six months after his appointment, he became the informal Chairman of the Joint Chiefs of Staff in Washington. Two months later he fell ill with what was diagnosed as acute gastroenteritis, and he spent over a month in recovery at the Augusta National Golf Club. He returned to his post in New York in mid-May, and in July 1949 took a two-month vacation out-of-state. Because the American Assembly had begun to take shape, he traveled around the country during summer and fall 1950, building financial support for it from various sources, including from Columbia Associates, a recently created alumni and benefactor organization for which he had helped recruit members.

Eisenhower was unknowingly building resentment and a reputation among the Columbia University faculty and staff as an absentee president who was using the university for his own interests. As a career military man, he naturally had little in common with the academics.

He did have some successes at Columbia.  Puzzled as to why no American university had undertaken the "continuous study of the causes, conduct and consequences of war", Eisenhower undertook the creation of the Institute of War and Peace Studies, a research facility whose purpose was to "study war as a tragic social phenomenon".  Eisenhower was able to use his network of wealthy friends and acquaintances to secure initial funding for it. Under its founding director, international relations scholar William T. R. Fox, the institute began in 1951 and became a pioneer in International security studies, one that would be emulated by other institutes in the United States and Britain later in the decade. The Institute of War and Peace Studies thus become one of the projects which Eisenhower considered constituted his "unique contribution" to Columbia.

The contacts gained through university and American Assembly fund-raising activities would later become important supporters in Eisenhower's bid for the Republican party nomination and the presidency. Meanwhile, Columbia University's liberal faculty members became disenchanted with the university president's ties to oilmen and businessmen, including Leonard McCollum, the president of Continental Oil; Frank Abrams, the chairman of Standard Oil of New Jersey; Bob Kleberg, the president of the King Ranch; H. J. Porter, a Texas oil executive; Bob Woodruff, the president of the Coca-Cola Corporation; and Clarence Francis, the chairman of General Foods.

As the president of Columbia, Eisenhower gave voice and form to his opinions about the supremacy and difficulties of American democracy. His tenure marked his transformation from military to civilian leadership. His biographer Travis Beal Jacobs also suggested that the alienation of the Columbia faculty contributed to sharp intellectual criticism of him for many years.

The trustees of Columbia University declined to accept Eisenhower's offer to resign in December 1950, when he took an extended leave from the university to become the Supreme Commander of the North Atlantic Treaty Organization (NATO), and he was given operational command of NATO forces in Europe. Eisenhower retired from active service as an army general on June 3, 1952, and he resumed his presidency of Columbia. Meanwhile, Eisenhower had become the Republican Party nominee for president of the United States, a contest that he won on  November 4. Eisenhower tendered his resignation as university president on November 15, 1952, effective January 19, 1953, the day before his inauguration.

NATO did not have strong bipartisan support in Congress at the time that Eisenhower assumed its military command. Eisenhower advised the participating European nations that it would be incumbent upon them to demonstrate their own commitment of troops and equipment to the NATO force before such would come from the war-weary United States.

At home, Eisenhower was more effective in making the case for NATO in Congress than the Truman administration had been. By the middle of 1951, with American and European support, NATO was a genuine military power. Nevertheless, Eisenhower thought that NATO would become a truly European alliance, with the American and Canadian commitments ending after about ten years.

Presidential campaign of 1952 

President Truman sensed a broad-based desire for an Eisenhower candidacy for president, and he again pressed him to run for the office as a Democrat in 1951. But Eisenhower voiced his disagreements with the Democrats and declared himself to be a Republican. A "Draft Eisenhower" movement in the Republican Party persuaded him to declare his candidacy in the 1952 presidential election to counter the candidacy of non-interventionist Senator Robert A. Taft. The effort was a long struggle; Eisenhower had to be convinced that political circumstances had created a genuine duty for him to offer himself as a candidate and that there was a mandate from the public for him to be their president. Henry Cabot Lodge and others succeeded in convincing him, and he resigned his command at NATO in June 1952 to campaign full-time.

Eisenhower defeated Taft for the nomination, having won critical delegate votes from Texas. His campaign was noted for the simple slogan "I Like Ike". It was essential to his success that Eisenhower express opposition to Roosevelt's policy at the Yalta Conference and to Truman's policies in Korea and China—matters in which he had once participated. In defeating Taft for the nomination, it became necessary for Eisenhower to appease the right-wing Old Guard of the Republican Party; his selection of Richard Nixon as the vice-president on the ticket was designed in part for that purpose. Nixon also provided a strong anti-communist reputation, as well as youth to counter Eisenhower's more advanced age.

Eisenhower insisted on campaigning in the South in the general election, against the advice of his campaign team, refusing to surrender the region to the Democratic Party. The campaign strategy was dubbed "K1C2" and was intended to focus on attacking the Truman administration on three failures: the Korean War, Communism, and corruption.

Two controversies tested him and his staff during the campaign, but they did not damage the campaign. One involved a report that Nixon had improperly received funds from a secret trust. Nixon spoke out adroitly to avoid potential damage, but the matter permanently alienated the two candidates. The second issue centered on Eisenhower's relented decision to confront the controversial methods of Joseph McCarthy on his home turf in a Wisconsin appearance. Just two weeks before the election, Eisenhower vowed to go to Korea and end the war there. He promised to maintain a strong commitment against Communism while avoiding the topic of NATO; finally, he stressed a corruption-free, frugal administration at home.

Eisenhower defeated Democratic candidate Adlai Stevenson II in a landslide, with an electoral margin of 442 to 89, marking the first Republican return to the White House in 20 years. He also brought a Republican majority in the House, by eight votes, and in the Senate, evenly divided with Vice President Nixon providing Republicans the majority.

Eisenhower was the last president born in the 19th century, and he was the oldest president-elect at age 62 since James Buchanan in 1856. He was the third commanding general of the Army to serve as president, after George Washington and Ulysses S. Grant, and the last not to have held political office prior to becoming president until Donald Trump entered office in January 2017.

Election of 1956 

The United States presidential election of 1956 was held on November 6, 1956. Eisenhower, the popular incumbent, successfully ran for re-election. The election was a re-match of 1952, as his opponent in 1956 was Stevenson, a former Illinois governor, whom Eisenhower had defeated four years earlier. Compared to the 1952 election, Eisenhower gained Kentucky, Louisiana, and West Virginia from Stevenson, while losing Missouri. His voters were less likely to bring up his leadership record. Instead what stood out this time, "was the response to personal qualities— to his sincerity, his integrity and sense of duty, his virtue as a family man, his religious devotion, and his sheer likeableness."

Presidency (1953–1961) 

Truman and Eisenhower had minimal discussions about the transition of administrations due to a complete estrangement between them as a result of campaigning. Eisenhower selected Joseph M. Dodge as his budget director, then asked Herbert Brownell Jr. and Lucius D. Clay to make recommendations for his cabinet appointments. He accepted their recommendations without exception; they included John Foster Dulles and George M. Humphrey with whom he developed his closest relationships, as well as Oveta Culp Hobby. His cabinet consisted of several corporate executives and one labor leader, and one journalist dubbed it "eight millionaires and a plumber". The cabinet was known for its lack of personal friends, office seekers, or experienced government administrators. He also upgraded the role of the National Security Council in planning all phases of the Cold War.

Prior to his inauguration, Eisenhower led a meeting of advisors at Pearl Harbor addressing foremost issues; agreed objectives were to balance the budget during his term, to bring the Korean War to an end, to defend vital interests at lower cost through nuclear deterrent, and to end price and wage controls. He also conducted the first pre-inaugural cabinet meeting in history in late 1952; he used this meeting to articulate his anti-communist Russia policy. His inaugural address was also exclusively devoted to foreign policy and included this same philosophy as well as a commitment to foreign trade and the United Nations.

Eisenhower made greater use of press conferences than any previous president, holding almost 200 over his two terms. He saw the benefit of maintaining a good relationship with the press, and he saw value in them as a means of direct communication with the American people.

Throughout his presidency, Eisenhower adhered to a political philosophy of dynamic conservatism. He described himself as a "progressive conservative" and used terms such as "progressive moderate" and "dynamic conservatism" to describe his approach. He continued all the major New Deal programs still in operation, especially Social Security. He expanded its programs and rolled them into the new Cabinet-level agency of the Department of Health, Education and Welfare, while extending benefits to an additional ten million workers. He implemented racial integration in the Armed Services in two years, which had not been completed under Truman.

In a private letter, Eisenhower wrote:

When the 1954 Congressional elections approached, it became evident that the Republicans were in danger of losing their thin majority in both houses. Eisenhower was among those who blamed the Old Guard for the losses, and he took up the charge to stop suspected efforts by the right wing to take control of the GOP. He then articulated his position as a moderate, progressive Republican: "I have just one purpose ... and that is to build up a strong progressive Republican Party in this country. If the right wing wants a fight, they are going to get it ... before I end up, either this Republican Party will reflect progressivism or I won't be with them anymore."

Eisenhower initially planned on serving only one term, but he remained flexible in case leading Republicans wanted him to run again. He was recovering from a heart attack late in September 1955 when he met with his closest advisors to evaluate the GOP's potential candidates; the group concluded that a second term was well advised, and he announced that he would run again in February 1956. Eisenhower was publicly noncommittal about having Nixon as the Vice President on his ticket; the question was an especially important one in light of his heart condition. He personally favored Robert B. Anderson, a Democrat who rejected his offer, so Eisenhower resolved to leave the matter in the hands of the party. In 1956, Eisenhower faced Adlai Stevenson again and won by an even larger landslide, with 457 of 531 electoral votes and 57.6-percent of the popular vote. The level of campaigning was curtailed out of health considerations.

Eisenhower made full use of his valet, chauffeur, and secretarial support; he rarely drove or even dialed a phone number. He was an avid fisherman, golfer, painter, and bridge player, and preferred active rather than passive forms of entertainment. On August 26, 1959, he was aboard the maiden flight of Air Force One, which replaced the Columbine as the presidential aircraft.

Interstate Highway System 

Eisenhower championed and signed the bill that authorized the Interstate Highway System in 1956. He justified the project through the Federal Aid Highway Act of 1956 as essential to American security during the Cold War. It was believed that large cities would be targets in a possible war, so the highways were designed to facilitate their evacuation and ease military maneuvers.

Eisenhower's goal to create improved highways was influenced by difficulties that he encountered during his involvement in the Army's 1919 Transcontinental Motor Convoy. He was assigned as an observer for the mission, which involved sending a convoy of Army vehicles coast to coast. His subsequent experience with the German autobahn limited-access road systems during the concluding stages of World War II convinced him of the benefits of an Interstate Highway System. The system could also be used as a runway for airplanes, which would be beneficial to war efforts. Franklin D. Roosevelt put this system into place with the Federal-Aid Highway Act of 1944. He thought that an interstate highway system would be beneficial for military operations and would also provide a measure of continued economic growth for the nation. The legislation initially stalled in Congress over the issuance of bonds to finance the project, but the legislative effort was renewed and Eisenhower signed the law in June 1956.

Foreign policy 

In 1953, the Republican Party's Old Guard presented Eisenhower with a dilemma by insisting he disavow the Yalta Agreements as beyond the constitutional authority of the Executive Branch; however, the death of Joseph Stalin in March 1953 made the matter a moot point. At this time, Eisenhower gave his Chance for Peace speech in which he attempted, unsuccessfully, to forestall the nuclear arms race with the Soviet Union by suggesting multiple opportunities presented by peaceful uses of nuclear materials. Biographer Stephen Ambrose opined that this was the best speech of Eisenhower's presidency. Eisenhower sought to make foreign markets available to American business, saying that it is a "serious and explicit purpose of our foreign policy, the encouragement of a hospitable climate for investment in foreign nations."

Nevertheless, the Cold War escalated during his presidency. When the Soviet Union successfully tested a hydrogen bomb in late November 1955, Eisenhower, against the advice of Dulles, decided to initiate a disarmament proposal to the Soviets. In an attempt to make their refusal more difficult, he proposed that both sides agree to dedicate fissionable material away from weapons toward peaceful uses, such as power generation. This approach was labeled "Atoms for Peace".

The U.N. speech was well received but the Soviets never acted upon it, due to an overarching concern for the greater stockpiles of nuclear weapons in the U.S. arsenal. Indeed, Eisenhower embarked upon a greater reliance on the use of nuclear weapons, while reducing conventional forces, and with them, the overall defense budget, a policy formulated as a result of Project Solarium and expressed in NSC 162/2. This approach became known as the "New Look", and was initiated with defense cuts in late 1953.

In 1955, American nuclear arms policy became one aimed primarily at arms control as opposed to disarmament. The failure of negotiations over arms until 1955 was due mainly to the refusal of the Russians to permit any sort of inspections. In talks located in London that year, they expressed a willingness to discuss inspections; the tables were then turned on Eisenhower when he responded with an unwillingness on the part of the U.S. to permit inspections. In May of that year, the Russians agreed to sign a treaty giving independence to Austria and paved the way for a Geneva summit with the US, UK and France. At the Geneva Conference, Eisenhower presented a proposal called "Open Skies" to facilitate disarmament, which included plans for Russia and the U.S. to provide mutual access to each other's skies for open surveillance of military infrastructure. Russian leader Nikita Khrushchev dismissed the proposal out of hand.

In 1954, Eisenhower articulated the domino theory in his outlook towards communism in Southeast Asia and also in Central America. He believed that if the communists were allowed to prevail in Vietnam, this would cause a succession of countries to fall to communism, from Laos through Malaysia and Indonesia ultimately to India. Likewise, the fall of Guatemala would end with the fall of neighboring Mexico. That year, the loss of North Vietnam to the communists and the rejection of his proposed European Defence Community (EDC) were serious defeats, but he remained optimistic in his opposition to the spread of communism, saying "Long faces don't win wars". As he had threatened the French in their rejection of EDC, he afterwards moved to restore West Germany as a full NATO partner. In 1954, he also induced Congress to create an Emergency Fund for International Affairs in order to support America's use of cultural diplomacy to strengthen international relations throughout Europe during the cold war.

With Eisenhower's leadership and Dulles' direction, CIA activities increased under the pretense of resisting the spread of communism in poorer countries; the CIA in part deposed the leaders of Iran in Operation Ajax, of Guatemala through Operation Pbsuccess, and possibly the newly independent Republic of the Congo (Léopoldville). Eisenhower authorized the assassination of Congolese leader Patrice Lumumba in 1960. However, the plot to poison him was abandoned. In 1954, Eisenhower wanted to increase surveillance inside the Soviet Union. With Dulles' recommendation, he authorized the deployment of thirty Lockheed U-2's at a cost of $35 million (equivalent to $ million in ). He approved an operation by the Central Intelligence Agency in which they recruited operatives in Cuba to carry out an extensive campaign of terrorism and sabotage, kill civilians, and cause economic damage. The CIA also trained and commanded pilots to bomb civilian airfields. The administration also planned the Bay of Pigs Invasion to overthrow Fidel Castro in Cuba, which John F. Kennedy was left to carry out.

Space Race 

Eisenhower and the CIA had known since at least January 1957, nine months before Sputnik, that Russia had the capability to launch a small payload into orbit and was likely to do so within a year. He may also privately have welcomed the Soviet satellite for its legal implications: By launching a satellite, the Soviet Union had in effect acknowledged that space was open to anyone who could access it, without needing permission from other nations.

On the whole, Eisenhower's support of the nation's fledgling space program was officially modest until the Soviet launch of Sputnik in 1957, gaining the Cold War enemy enormous prestige around the world. He then launched a national campaign that funded not just space exploration but a major strengthening of science and higher education. The Eisenhower administration determined to adopt a non-aggressive policy that would allow "space-crafts of any state to overfly all states, a region free of military posturing and launch Earth satellites to explore space". His Open Skies Policy attempted to legitimize illegal Lockheed U-2 flyovers and Project Genetrix while paving the way for spy satellite technology to orbit over sovereign territory, however Nikolai Bulganin and Nikita Khrushchev declined Eisenhower's proposal at the Geneva conference in July 1955. In response to Sputnik being launched in October 1957, Eisenhower created NASA as a civilian space agency in October 1958, signed a landmark science education law, and improved relations with American scientists.

Fear spread through the United States that the Soviet Union would invade and spread communism, so Eisenhower wanted to not only create a surveillance satellite to detect any threats but ballistic missiles that would protect the United States. In strategic terms, it was Eisenhower who devised the American basic strategy of nuclear deterrence based upon the triad of B-52 strategic bombers, land-based intercontinental ballistic missiles (ICBMs), and Polaris submarine-launched ballistic missiles (SLBMs).

NASA planners projected that human spaceflight would pull the United States ahead in the Space Race as well as accomplishing their long time goal; however, in 1960, an Ad Hoc Panel on Man-in-Space concluded that "man-in-space can not be justified" and was too costly. Eisenhower later resented the space program and its gargantuan price tag—he was quoted as saying, "Anyone who would spend $40 billion in a race to the moon for national prestige is nuts."

Korean War, Free China and Red China 
In late 1952, Eisenhower went to Korea and discovered a military and political stalemate. Once in office, when the Chinese People's Volunteer Army began a buildup in the Kaesong sanctuary, he considered using nuclear weapons if an armistice was not reached. Whether China was informed of the potential for nuclear force is unknown.  His earlier military reputation in Europe was effective with the Chinese communists. The National Security Council, the Joint Chiefs of Staff, and the Strategic Air Command (SAC) devised detailed plans for nuclear war against Red China. With the death of Stalin in early March 1953, Russian support for a Chinese communists hard-line weakened and Red China decided to compromise on the prisoner issue.

In July 1953, an armistice took effect with Korea divided along approximately the same boundary as in 1950. The armistice and boundary remain in effect today. The armistice, which concluded despite opposition from Secretary Dulles, South Korean President Syngman Rhee, and also within Eisenhower's party, has been described by biographer Ambrose as the greatest achievement of the administration. Eisenhower had the insight to realize that unlimited war in the nuclear age was unthinkable, and limited war unwinnable.

A point of emphasis in Eisenhower's campaign had been his endorsement of a policy of liberation from communism as opposed to a policy of containment. This remained his preference despite the armistice with Korea. Throughout his terms Eisenhower took a hard-line attitude toward Red China, as demanded by conservative Republicans, with the goal of driving a wedge between Red China and the Soviet Union.

Eisenhower continued Truman's policy of recognizing the Republic of China (Taiwan) as the legitimate government of China, not the Peking (Beijing) regime. There were localized flare-ups when the People's Liberation Army began shelling the islands of Quemoy and Matsu in September 1954. Eisenhower received recommendations embracing every variation of response to the aggression of the Chinese communists. He thought it essential to have every possible option available to him as the crisis unfolded.

The Sino-American Mutual Defense Treaty with the Republic of China was signed in December 1954. He requested and secured from Congress their "Free China Resolution" in January 1955, which gave Eisenhower unprecedented power in advance to use military force at any level of his choosing in defense of Free China and the Pescadores. The Resolution bolstered the morale of the Chinese nationalists, and signaled to Beijing that the U.S. was committed to holding the line.

Eisenhower openly threatened the Chinese communists with the use of nuclear weapons, authorizing a series of bomb tests labeled Operation Teapot. Nevertheless, he left the Chinese communists guessing as to the exact nature of his nuclear response. This allowed Eisenhower to accomplish all of his objectives—the end of this communist encroachment, the retention of the Islands by the Chinese nationalists and continued peace. Defense of the Republic of China from an invasion remains a core American policy.

By the end of 1954, Eisenhower's military and foreign policy experts—the NSC, JCS and State Dept.—had unanimously urged him, on no less than five occasions, to launch an atomic attack against Red China; yet he consistently refused to do so and felt a distinct sense of accomplishment in having sufficiently confronted communism while keeping world peace.

Southeast Asia 
Early in 1953, the French asked Eisenhower for help in French Indochina against the Communists, supplied from China, who were fighting the First Indochina War. Eisenhower sent Lt. General John W. "Iron Mike" O'Daniel to Vietnam to study and assess the French forces there. Chief of Staff Matthew Ridgway dissuaded the President from intervening by presenting a comprehensive estimate of the massive military deployment that would be necessary. Eisenhower stated prophetically that "this war would absorb our troops by divisions."

Eisenhower did provide France with bombers and non-combat personnel. After a few months with no success by the French, he added other aircraft to drop napalm for clearing purposes. Further requests for assistance from the French were agreed to but only on conditions Eisenhower knew were impossible to meet – allied participation and congressional approval. When the French fortress of Dien Bien Phu fell to the Vietnamese Communists in May 1954, Eisenhower refused to intervene despite urgings from the Chairman of the Joint Chiefs, the Vice President and the head of NCS.

Eisenhower responded to the French defeat with the formation of the SEATO (Southeast Asia Treaty Organization) Alliance with the UK, France, New Zealand and Australia in defense of Vietnam against communism. At that time the French and Chinese reconvened the Geneva peace talks; Eisenhower agreed the US would participate only as an observer. After France and the Communists agreed to a partition of Vietnam, Eisenhower rejected the agreement, offering military and economic aid to southern Vietnam. Ambrose argues that Eisenhower, by not participating in the Geneva agreement, had kept the U.S. out of Vietnam; nevertheless, with the formation of SEATO, he had, in the end, put the U.S. back into the conflict.

In late 1954, Gen. J. Lawton Collins was made ambassador to "Free Vietnam" (the term South Vietnam came into use in 1955), effectively elevating the country to sovereign status. Collins' instructions were to support the leader Ngo Dinh Diem in subverting communism, by helping him to build an army and wage a military campaign. In February 1955, Eisenhower dispatched the first American soldiers to Vietnam as military advisors to Diem's army. After Diem announced the formation of the Republic of Vietnam (RVN, commonly known as South Vietnam) in October, Eisenhower immediately recognized the new state and offered military, economic, and technical assistance.

In the years that followed, Eisenhower increased the number of U.S. military advisors in South Vietnam to 900 men. This was due to North Vietnam's support of "uprisings" in the south and concern the nation would fall. In May 1957 Diem, then President of South Vietnam, made a state visit to the United States for ten days. President Eisenhower pledged his continued support, and a parade was held in Diem's honor in New York City. Although Diem was publicly praised, in private Secretary of State John Foster Dulles conceded that Diem had been selected because there were no better alternatives.

After the election of November 1960, Eisenhower, in a briefing with John F. Kennedy, pointed out the communist threat in Southeast Asia as requiring prioritization in the next administration. Eisenhower told Kennedy he considered Laos "the cork in the bottle" with regard to the regional threat.

Legitimation of Francoist Spain 

The Pact of Madrid, signed on September 23, 1953, by Francoist Spain and the United States, was a significant effort to break international isolation of Spain after World War II, together with the Concordat of 1953. This development came at a time when other victorious Allies of World War II and much of the rest of the world remained hostile (for the 1946 United Nations condemnation of the Francoist regime, see "Spanish Question") to a fascist regime sympathetic to the cause of the former Axis powers and established with Nazi assistance. This accord took the form of three separate executive agreements that pledged the United States to furnish economic and military aid to Spain. The United States, in turn, was to be permitted to construct and to utilize air and naval bases on Spanish territory (Naval Station Rota, Morón Air Base, Torrejón Air Base and Zaragoza Air Base).

Eisenhower personally visited Spain in December 1959 to meet dictator Francisco Franco and consolidate his international legitimation.

The Middle East and Eisenhower doctrine 

Even before he was inaugurated Eisenhower accepted a request from the British government to restore the Shah of Iran (Mohammad Reza Pahlavi) to power. He therefore authorized the Central Intelligence Agency to overthrow Prime Minister Mohammad Mosaddegh. This resulted in increased strategic control over Iranian oil by U.S. and British companies.

In November 1956, Eisenhower forced an end to the combined British, French and Israeli invasion of Egypt in response to the Suez Crisis, receiving praise from Egyptian president Gamal Abdel Nasser. Simultaneously he condemned the brutal Soviet invasion of Hungary in response to the Hungarian Revolution of 1956. He publicly disavowed his allies at the United Nations, and used financial and diplomatic pressure to make them withdraw from Egypt. Eisenhower explicitly defended his strong position against Britain and France in his memoirs, which were published in 1965.

After the Suez Crisis, the United States became the protector of unstable friendly governments in the Middle East via the "Eisenhower Doctrine". Designed by Secretary of State Dulles, it held the U.S. would be "prepared to use armed force ... [to counter] aggression from any country controlled by international communism". Further, the United States would provide economic and military aid and, if necessary, use military force to stop the spread of communism in the Middle East.

Eisenhower applied the doctrine in 1957–1958 by dispensing economic aid to shore up the Kingdom of Jordan, and by encouraging Syria's neighbors to consider military operations against it. More dramatically, in July 1958, he sent 15,000 Marines and soldiers to Lebanon as part of Operation Blue Bat, a non-combat peace-keeping mission to stabilize the pro-Western government and to prevent a radical revolution from sweeping over that country.

The mission proved a success and the Marines departed three months later. The deployment came in response to the urgent request of Lebanese president Camille Chamoun after sectarian violence had erupted in the country. Washington considered the military intervention successful since it brought about regional stability, weakened Soviet influence, and intimidated the Egyptian and Syrian governments, whose anti-West political position had hardened after the Suez Crisis.

Most Arab countries were skeptical about the "Eisenhower doctrine" because they considered "Zionist imperialism" the real danger. However, they did take the opportunity to obtain free money and weapons. Egypt and Syria, supported by the Soviet Union, openly opposed the initiative. However, Egypt received American aid until the Six-Day War in 1967.

As the Cold War deepened, Dulles sought to isolate the Soviet Union by building regional alliances of nations against it. Critics sometimes called it "pacto-mania".

1960 U-2 incident 

On May 1, 1960, a U.S. one-man U-2 spy plane was shot down at high altitude over Soviet airspace. The flight was made to gain photo intelligence before the scheduled opening of an east–west summit conference, which had been scheduled in Paris, 15 days later. Captain Francis Gary Powers had bailed out of his aircraft and was captured after parachuting down onto Russian soil. Four days after Powers disappeared, the Eisenhower Administration had NASA issue a very detailed press release noting that an aircraft had "gone missing" north of Turkey. It speculated that the pilot might have fallen unconscious while the autopilot was still engaged, and falsely claimed that "the pilot reported over the emergency frequency that he was experiencing oxygen difficulties."

Soviet Premier Nikita Khrushchev announced that a "spy-plane" had been shot down but intentionally made no reference to the pilot. As a result, the Eisenhower Administration, thinking the pilot had died in the crash, authorized the release of a cover story claiming that the plane was a "weather research aircraft" which had unintentionally strayed into Soviet airspace after the pilot had radioed "difficulties with his oxygen equipment" while flying over Turkey. The Soviets put Captain Powers on trial and displayed parts of the U-2, which had been recovered almost fully intact.

The Four Power Paris Summit in May 1960 with Eisenhower, Nikita Khrushchev, Harold Macmillan and Charles de Gaulle collapsed because of the incident. Eisenhower refused to accede to Khrushchev's demands that he apologize. Therefore, Khrushchev would not take part in the summit. Up until this event, Eisenhower felt he had been making progress towards better relations with the Soviet Union. Nuclear arms reduction and Berlin were to have been discussed at the summit. Eisenhower stated it had all been ruined because of that "stupid U-2 business".

The affair was an embarrassment for United States prestige. Further, the Senate Foreign Relations Committee held a lengthy inquiry into the U-2 incident. In Russia, Captain Powers made a forced confession and apology. On August 19, 1960, Powers was convicted of espionage and sentenced to imprisonment. On February 10, 1962, Powers was exchanged for Rudolf Abel in Berlin and returned to the U.S.

Civil rights 

While President Truman's 1948 Executive Order 9981 had begun the process of desegregating the Armed Forces, actual implementation had been slow. Eisenhower made clear his stance in his first State of the Union address in February 1953, saying "I propose to use whatever authority exists in the office of the President to end segregation in the District of Columbia, including the Federal Government, and any segregation in the Armed Forces". When he encountered opposition from the services, he used government control of military spending to force the change through, stating "Wherever Federal Funds are expended ..., I do not see how any American can justify ... a discrimination in the expenditure of those funds".

When Robert B. Anderson, Eisenhower's first Secretary of the Navy, argued that the U.S. Navy must recognize the "customs and usages prevailing in certain geographic areas of our country which the Navy had no part in creating," Eisenhower overruled him: "We have not taken and we shall not take a single backward step. There must be no second class citizens in this country."

The administration declared racial discrimination a national security issue, as Communists around the world used the racial discrimination and history of violence in the U.S. as a point of propaganda attack.

Eisenhower told District of Columbia officials to make Washington a model for the rest of the country in integrating black and white public school children. He proposed to Congress the Civil Rights Act of 1957 and of 1960 and signed those acts into law. The 1957 act for the first time established a permanent civil rights office inside the Justice Department and a Civil Rights Commission to hear testimony about abuses of voting rights. Although both acts were much weaker than subsequent civil rights legislation, they constituted the first significant civil rights acts since 1875.

In 1957 the state of Arkansas refused to honor a federal court order to integrate their public school system stemming from the Brown decision. Eisenhower demanded that Arkansas governor Orval Faubus obey the court order. When Faubus balked, the president placed the Arkansas National Guard under federal control and sent in the 101st Airborne Division. They escorted and protected nine black students' entry to Little Rock Central High School, an all-white public school, marking the first time since the Reconstruction Era the federal government had used federal troops in the South to enforce the U. S. Constitution. Martin Luther King Jr. wrote to Eisenhower to thank him for his actions, writing "The overwhelming majority of southerners, Negro and white, stand firmly behind your resolute action to restore law and order in Little Rock".

Eisenhower's administration contributed to the McCarthyist Lavender Scare with President Eisenhower issuing Executive Order 10450 in 1953. During Eisenhower's presidency thousands of lesbian and gay applicants were barred from federal employment and over 5,000 federal employees were fired under suspicions of being homosexual. From 1947 to 1961 the number of firings based on sexual orientation were far greater than those for membership in the Communist Party, and government officials intentionally campaigned to make "homosexual" synonymous with "Communist traitor" such that LGBT people were treated as a national security threat stemming from the belief they were susceptible to blackmail and exploitation.

Relations with Congress 

Eisenhower had a Republican Congress for only his first two years in office; in the Senate, Republicans held the majority by a one-vote margin. Despite being Eisenhower's political opponent for the 1952 Republican presidential nomination, Senator Majority Leader Robert A. Taft assisted Eisenhower a great deal by promoting the President's proposals among the "Old Guard" Republican Senators. Taft's death in July 1953 - six months into Eisenhower's presidency - affected Eisenhower both personally and professionally. The President noted he had lost "a dear friend" with Taft's passing. Eisenhower disliked Taft's successor as Majority Leader, Senator William Knowland, and the relationship between the two men led to tension between the Senate and the White House.

This prevented Eisenhower from openly condemning Joseph McCarthy's highly criticized methods against communism. To facilitate relations with Congress, Eisenhower decided to ignore McCarthy's controversies and thereby deprive them of more energy from the involvement of the White House. This position drew criticism from a number of corners. In late 1953, McCarthy declared on national television that the employment of communists within the government was a menace and would be a pivotal issue in the 1954 Senate elections. Eisenhower was urged to respond directly and specify the various measures he had taken to purge the government of communists.

Among Eisenhower's objectives in not directly confronting McCarthy was to prevent McCarthy from dragging the Atomic Energy Commission (AEC) into McCarthy's witch hunt for communists, which might interfere with the AEC's work on hydrogen bombs and other weapons programs. In December 1953, Eisenhower learned that one of America's nuclear scientists, J. Robert Oppenheimer, had been accused of being a spy for the Soviet Union.  Although Eisenhower never really believed that these allegations were true, in January 1954 he ordered that "a blank wall" be placed between Oppenheimer and all defense-related activities. The Oppenheimer security hearing was conducted later that year, resulting in the physicist losing his security clearance. The matter was controversial at the time and remained so in later years, with Oppenheimer achieving a certain martyrdom. The case would reflect poorly on Eisenhower as well, but the president had never examined it in any detail and had instead relied excessively upon the advice of his subordinates, especially that of AEC chairman Lewis Strauss. Eisenhower later suffered a major political defeat when his nomination of Strauss to be Secretary of Commerce was defeated in the Senate in 1959, in part due to Strauss's role in the Oppenheimer matter.

In May 1955, McCarthy threatened to issue subpoenas to White House personnel. Eisenhower was furious, and issued an order as follows: "It is essential to efficient and effective administration that employees of the Executive Branch be in a position to be completely candid in advising with each other on official matters ... it is not in the public interest that any of their conversations or communications, or any documents or reproductions, concerning such advice be disclosed." This was an unprecedented step by Eisenhower to protect communication beyond the confines of a cabinet meeting, and soon became a tradition known as executive privilege. Eisenhower's denial of McCarthy's access to his staff reduced McCarthy's hearings to rants about trivial matters and contributed to his ultimate downfall.

In early 1954, the Old Guard put forward a constitutional amendment, called the Bricker Amendment, which would curtail international agreements by the Chief Executive, such as the Yalta Agreements. Eisenhower opposed the measure. The Old Guard agreed with Eisenhower on the development and ownership of nuclear reactors by private enterprises, which the Democrats opposed. The President succeeded in getting legislation creating a system of licensure for nuclear plants by the AEC.

The Democrats gained a majority in both houses in the 1954 election. Eisenhower had to work with the Democratic Majority Leader Lyndon B. Johnson (later U.S. president) in the Senate and Speaker Sam Rayburn in the House, both from Texas. Joe Martin, the Republican Speaker from 1947 to 1949 and again from 1953 to 1955, wrote that Eisenhower "never surrounded himself with assistants who could solve political problems with professional skill. There were exceptions, Leonard W. Hall, for example, who as chairman of the Republican National Committee tried to open the administration's eyes to the political facts of life, with occasional success. However, these exceptions were not enough to right the balance."

Speaker Martin concluded that Eisenhower worked too much through subordinates in dealing with Congress, with results, "often the reverse of what he has desired" because Members of Congress, "resent having some young fellow who was picked up by the White House without ever having been elected to office himself coming around and telling them 'The Chief wants this'. The administration never made use of many Republicans of consequence whose services in one form or another would have been available for the asking."

Judicial appointments

Supreme Court 

Eisenhower appointed the following Justices to the Supreme Court of the United States:
 Earl Warren, 1953 (Chief Justice)
 John Marshall Harlan II, 1954
 William J. Brennan, 1956
 Charles Evans Whittaker, 1957
 Potter Stewart, 1958

Whittaker was unsuited for the role and soon retired (in 1962, after Eisenhower's presidency had ended). Stewart and Harlan were conservative Republicans, while Brennan was a Democrat who became a leading voice for liberalism. In selecting a Chief Justice, Eisenhower looked for an experienced jurist who could appeal to liberals in the party as well as law-and-order conservatives, noting privately that Warren "represents the kind of political, economic, and social thinking that I believe we need on the Supreme Court ... He has a national name for integrity, uprightness, and courage that, again, I believe we need on the Court". In the next few years Warren led the Court in a series of liberal decisions that revolutionized the role of the Court.

States admitted to the Union 
Two states were admitted to the Union during Eisenhower's presidency.
 Alaska – January 3, 1959 (49th state)
 Hawaii – August 21, 1959 (50th state)

Health issues 
Eisenhower began chain smoking cigarettes at West Point, often three or four packs a day. He joked that he "gave [himself] an order" to stop cold turkey in 1949. But Evan Thomas says the true story was more complex. At first, he removed cigarettes and ashtrays, but that did not work. He told a friend:
I decided to make a game of the whole business and try to achieve a feeling of some superiority ... So I stuffed cigarettes in every pocket, put them around my office on the desk ... [and] made it a practice to offer a cigarette to anyone who came in ... while mentally reminding myself as I sat down, "I do not have to do what that poor fellow is doing."

He was the first president to release information about his health and medical records while in office, but people around him deliberately misled the public about his health. On September 24, 1955, while vacationing in Colorado, he had a serious heart attack. Howard Snyder, his personal physician, misdiagnosed the symptoms as indigestion, and failed to call in help that was urgently needed. Snyder later falsified his own records to cover his blunder and to allow Eisenhower to imply that he was healthy enough to do his job.

The heart attack required six weeks' hospitalization, during which time Nixon, Dulles, and Sherman Adams assumed administrative duties and provided communication with the president. He was treated by Paul Dudley White, a cardiologist with a national reputation, who regularly informed the press of the president's progress. Instead of discounting him as a candidate for a second term as president, his physician recommended a second term as essential to his recovery.

As a consequence of his heart attack Eisenhower developed a left ventricular aneurysm, which caused a mild stroke during a cabinet meeting on November 25, 1957, when Eisenhower suddenly found himself unable to move his right hand, or to speak as the stroke had caused aphasia. The president also suffered from Crohn's disease, chronic inflammatory condition of the intestine, which necessitated surgery for a bowel obstruction on June 9, 1956. To treat the intestinal block, surgeons bypassed about ten inches of his small intestine. His scheduled meeting with Indian Prime Minister Jawaharlal Nehru was postponed so he could recover at his farm. He was still recovering from this operation during the Suez Crisis. Eisenhower's health issues forced him to give up smoking and make some changes to his diet, but he still drank alcohol. During a visit to England he complained of dizziness and had to have his blood pressure checked on August 29, 1959; however, before dinner at prime ministerial manor house Chequers on the next day his doctor, General Howard Snyder, recalled that Eisenhower "drank several gin-and-tonics, and one or two gins on the rocks ... three or four wines with the dinner".

Eisenhower's health during the last three years of his second term in office was relatively good. Eventually, after leaving the White House, he suffered several additional and ultimately crippling heart attacks. A severe heart attack in August 1965 largely ended his participation in public affairs. On December 12, 1966, his gallbladder was removed, containing 16 gallstones. After Eisenhower's death in 1969 (see below), an autopsy revealed an undiagnosed adrenal pheochromocytoma, a benign adrenalin-secreting tumor that may have made him more vulnerable to heart disease during his presidency. Eisenhower suffered seven heart attacks from 1955 until his death.

End of presidency 
The 22nd Amendment to the U.S. Constitution, which set a two-term limit on the presidency, was ratified in 1951. Eisenhower was the first president constitutionally prevented from serving a third term.

Eisenhower was also the first outgoing president to come under the protection of the Former Presidents Act; two living former presidents, Herbert Hoover and Harry S. Truman, had left office before the act was passed. Under the act, Eisenhower was entitled to a lifetime pension, state-provided staff and a Secret Service security detail.

In the 1960 election to choose his successor, Eisenhower endorsed Nixon over Democrat John F. Kennedy. He told friends, "I will do almost anything to avoid turning my chair and country over to Kennedy." He actively campaigned for Nixon in the final days, although he may have done Nixon some harm. When asked by reporters at the end of a televised press conference to list one of Nixon's policy ideas he had adopted, Eisenhower joked, "If you give me a week, I might think of one. I don't remember." Kennedy's campaign used the quote in one of its campaign commercials. Nixon narrowly lost to Kennedy. Eisenhower, who was, at 70, the oldest president in history to date, was succeeded by 43-year-old Kennedy, the youngest elected president.

It was originally intended for President Eisenhower to have a more active role in the campaign as he wanted to respond to attacks Kennedy made on his administration. However, First Lady Mamie Eisenhower expressed concern to Second Lady Pat Nixon about the strain campaigning would put on his heart, and wanted the president to withdraw, without letting him know of her intervention. Vice President Nixon himself was informed by White House physician Major General Howard Snyder that he could not approve a heavy campaign schedule for the president, whose health problems had been exacerbated by Kennedy's attacks. Nixon then convinced Eisenhower not to go ahead with the expanded campaign schedule and limit himself to the original schedule. Nixon reflected that if Eisenhower had carried out his expanded campaign schedule he might have had a decisive impact on the outcome of the election, especially in states that Kennedy won with razor-thin margins. Mamie did not tell Dwight why Nixon changed his mind on Dwight's campaigning until years later.

On January 17, 1961, Eisenhower gave his final televised Address to the Nation from the Oval Office. In his farewell speech, Eisenhower raised the issue of the Cold War and role of the U.S. armed forces. He described the Cold War: "We face a hostile ideology global in scope, atheistic in character, ruthless in purpose and insidious in method ..." and warned about what he saw as unjustified government spending proposals. He continued with a warning that "we must guard against the acquisition of unwarranted influence, whether sought or unsought, by the military–industrial complex."

Eisenhower elaborated, "we recognize the imperative need for this development ... the potential for the disastrous rise of misplaced power exists and will persist ... Only an alert and knowledgeable citizenry can compel the proper meshing of the huge industrial and military machinery of defense with our peaceful methods and goals, so that security and liberty may prosper together."

Because of legal issues related to holding a military rank while in a civilian office, Eisenhower had resigned his permanent commission as General of the Army before entering the Presidency. Upon completion of his presidential term, his commission was reactivated by Congress and Eisenhower again was commissioned a five-star general in the United States Army.

Post-presidency (1961–1969) 

Following the presidency, Eisenhower moved to the place where he and Mamie had spent much of their post-war time, a working farm adjacent to the battlefield at Gettysburg, Pennsylvania, 70 miles from his ancestral home in Elizabethville, Dauphin County, Pennsylvania. They also maintained a retirement home in Palm Desert, California. In 1967 the Eisenhowers donated the Gettysburg farm to the National Park Service.

After leaving office, Eisenhower did not completely retreat from political life. He flew to San Antonio, where he had been stationed years earlier, to support John W. Goode, the unsuccessful Republican candidate against the Democrat Henry B. Gonzalez for Texas's 20th congressional district seat. He addressed the 1964 Republican National Convention, in San Francisco, and appeared with party nominee Barry Goldwater in a campaign commercial from his Gettysburg retreat. That endorsement came somewhat reluctantly, because Goldwater had in the late 1950s criticized Eisenhower's administration as "a dime-store New Deal". On January 20, 1969, the day Nixon was inaugurated as President, Eisenhower issued a statement praising his former vice president and calling it a "day for rejoicing".

Death 
On the morning of March 28, 1969, Eisenhower died in Washington, D.C., of congestive heart failure at Walter Reed Army Medical Center, at age 78. The following day, his body was moved to the Washington National Cathedral's Bethlehem Chapel, where he lay in repose for 28 hours. He was then transported to the United States Capitol, where he lay in state in the Capitol Rotunda on March 30 and 31. A state funeral service was conducted at the Washington National Cathedral on March 31. The president and First Lady, Richard and Pat Nixon, attended, as did former president Lyndon Johnson. Also among the 2,000 invited guests were U.N. Secretary General U Thant and 191 foreign delegates from 78 countries, including 10 foreign heads of state and government. Notable guests included President Charles de Gaulle of France, who was in the United States for the first time since the state funeral of John F. Kennedy, Chancellor Kurt-Georg Kiesinger of West Germany, King Baudouin of Belgium and Shah Mohammad Reza Pahlavi of Iran.

The service included the singing of Faure's The Palms, and the playing of the hymn Onward, Christian Soldiers.

That evening, Eisenhower's body was placed onto a special funeral train for its journey from the nation's capital through seven states to his hometown of Abilene, Kansas. First incorporated into President Abraham Lincoln's funeral in 1865, a funeral train would not be part of a U.S. state funeral again until 2018. Eisenhower is buried inside the Place of Meditation, the chapel on the grounds of the Eisenhower Presidential Center in Abilene. As requested, he was buried in a Government Issue casket, wearing his World War II uniform, decorated with Army Distinguished Service Medal with three oak leaf clusters, Navy Distinguished Service Medal, and the Legion of Merit. Buried alongside Eisenhower are his son Doud, who died at age 3 in 1921, and wife Mamie, who died in 1979.

President Richard Nixon eulogized Eisenhower in 1969, saying:

Legacy and memory 
Eisenhower's reputation declined in the immediate years after he left office. During his presidency, he was widely seen by critics as an inactive, uninspiring, golf-playing president. This was in stark contrast to his vigorous young successor, John F. Kennedy, who was 26 years his junior. Despite his unprecedented use of Army troops to enforce a federal desegregation order at Central High School in Little Rock, Eisenhower was criticized for his reluctance to support the civil rights movement to the degree that activists wanted. Eisenhower also attracted criticism for his handling of the 1960 U-2 incident and the associated international embarrassment, for the Soviet Union's perceived leadership in the nuclear arms race and the Space Race, and for his failure to publicly oppose McCarthyism. In particular, Eisenhower was criticized for failing to defend George C. Marshall from attacks by Joseph McCarthy, though he privately deplored McCarthy's tactics and claims.

Following the access of Eisenhower's private papers, his reputation changed amongst presidential historians. Historian John Lewis Gaddis has summarized a more recent turnaround in evaluations by historians:

Historians long ago abandoned the view that Eisenhower's was a failed presidency. He did, after all, end the Korean War without getting into any others. He stabilized, and did not escalate, the Soviet–American rivalry. He strengthened European alliances while withdrawing support from European colonialism. He rescued the Republican Party from isolationism and McCarthyism. He maintained prosperity, balanced the budget, promoted technological innovation, facilitated (if reluctantly) the civil rights movement and warned, in the most memorable farewell address since Washington's, of a "military–industrial complex" that could endanger the nation's liberties. Not until Reagan would another president leave office with so strong a sense of having accomplished what he set out to do.

Although conservatism in politics was strong during the 1950s, and Eisenhower generally espoused conservative sentiments, his administration concerned itself mostly with foreign affairs (an area in which the career-military president had more knowledge) and pursued a hands-off domestic policy. Eisenhower looked to moderation and cooperation as a means of governance, which he dubbed "The Middle Way".

Although he sought to slow or contain the New Deal and other federal programs, he did not attempt to repeal them outright. In doing so, Eisenhower was popular among the liberal wing of the Republican Party. Conservative critics of his administration thought that he did not do enough to advance the goals of the right; according to Hans Morgenthau, "Eisenhower's victories were but accidents without consequence in the history of the Republican party."

Since the 19th century, many if not all presidents were assisted by a central figure or "gatekeeper", sometimes described as the president's private secretary, sometimes with no official title at all. Eisenhower formalized this role, introducing the office of White House Chief of Staff – an idea he borrowed from the United States Army. Every president after Lyndon Johnson has also appointed staff to this position. Initially, Gerald Ford and Jimmy Carter tried to operate without a chief of staff, but each eventually appointed one.

As president, Eisenhower also initiated the "up or out" policy that still prevails in the U.S. military. Officers who are passed over for promotion twice, are then usually honorably but quickly discharged, in order to make way for younger, and more able officers. (As an army officer, Eisenhower had been stuck at the rank of major for 16 years in the interwar period.)

On December 20, 1944, Eisenhower was appointed to the rank of General of the Army, placing him in the company of George Marshall, Henry "Hap" Arnold, and Douglas MacArthur, the only four men to achieve the rank in World War II. Along with Omar Bradley, they were the only five men to achieve the rank since the August 5, 1888 death of Philip Sheridan, and the only five men to hold the rank of five-star general. The rank was created by an Act of Congress on a temporary basis, when Public Law 78-482 was passed on December 14, 1944, as a temporary rank, subject to reversion to permanent rank six months after the end of the war. The temporary rank was then declared permanent on March 23, 1946, by Public Law 333 of the 79th Congress, which also awarded full pay and allowances in the grade to those on the retired list. It was created to give the most senior American commanders parity of rank with their British counterparts holding the ranks of field marshal and admiral of the fleet. This second General of the Army rank is not the same as the post–Civil War era version because of its purpose and five stars.

Eisenhower founded People to People International in 1956, based on his belief that citizen interaction would promote cultural interaction and world peace. The program includes a student ambassador component, which sends American youth on educational trips to other countries.

During his second term as president, Eisenhower distinctively preserved his presidential gratitude by awarding individuals a special memento. This memento was a series of specially designed U.S. Mint presidential appreciation medals. Eisenhower presented the medal as an expression of his appreciation and the medal is a keepsake reminder for the recipient.

The development of the appreciation medals was initiated by the White House and executed by the United States Mint, through the Philadelphia Mint. The medals were struck from September 1958 through October 1960. A total of twenty designs are cataloged with a total mintage of 9,858. Each of the designs incorporates the text "with appreciation" or "with personal and official gratitude" accompanied with Eisenhower's initials "D.D.E." or facsimile signature. The design also incorporates location, date, and/or significant event. Prior to the end of his second term as president, 1,451 medals were turned in to the Bureau of the Mint and destroyed. The Eisenhower appreciation medals are part of the Presidential Medal of Appreciation Award Medal Series.

Tributes and memorials 

The Interstate Highway System is officially known as the "Dwight D. Eisenhower National System of Interstate and Defense Highways" in his honor. It was inspired in part by Eisenhower's own Army experiences in World War II, where he recognized the advantages of the autobahn system in Germany. Commemorative signs reading "Eisenhower Interstate System" and bearing Eisenhower's permanent 5-star rank insignia were introduced in 1993 and now are displayed throughout the Interstate System. Several highways are also named for him, including the Eisenhower Expressway (Interstate 290) near Chicago, the Eisenhower Tunnel on Interstate 70 west of Denver, and Interstate 80 in California.

Dwight D. Eisenhower School for National Security and Resource Strategy is a senior war college of the Department of Defense's National Defense University in Washington, DC. Eisenhower graduated from this school when it was previously known as the Army Industrial College. The school's building on Fort Lesley J. McNair, when it was known as the Industrial College of the Armed Forces, was dedicated as Eisenhower Hall in 1960.

Eisenhower was honored on a US one dollar coin, minted from 1971 to 1978. His centenary was honored on a commemorative dollar coin issued in 1990.

In 1969 four major record companies – ABC Records, MGM Records, Buddha Records and Caedmon Audio – released tribute albums in Eisenhower's honor.

In 1999, the United States Congress created the Dwight D. Eisenhower Memorial Commission, to create an enduring national memorial in Washington, D.C. In 2009 the commission chose the architect Frank Gehry to design the memorial. The memorial will stand on a four-acre site near the National Mall on Maryland Avenue, SW across the street from the National Air and Space Museum.

In December 1999 he was listed on Gallup's List of Most Widely Admired People of the 20th century. In 2009 he was named to the World Golf Hall of Fame in the Lifetime Achievement category for his contributions to the sport. In 1973, he was inducted into the Hall of Great Westerners of the National Cowboy & Western Heritage Museum. The Naming Commission has recommended that Fort Gordon be renamed Fort Eisenhower.

Honors

Awards and decorations

Freedom of the City
Eisenhower received the Freedom honor from several locations, including:

  Freedom of the City of London on June 12, 1945
  Freedom of the City of Belfast on August 24, 1945
  Freedom of the City of Edinburgh in 1946
  Freedom of the Burgh of Maybole in October 1946

Honorary degrees
Eisenhower received many honorary degrees from universities and colleges around the world. These included:

Promotions 

Note: Eisenhower relinquished his active duty status when he became president on January 20, 1953. He was returned to active duty when he left office eight years later.

Family tree

See also 
 "And I don't care what it is", phrase by Eisenhower, 1952, on religion
 Atoms for Peace, a speech to the UN General Assembly in December 1953
 Committee on Scientists and Engineers
 Eisenhower baseball controversy
 Eisenhower dollar
 Eisenhower method for time management
 Eisenhower National Historic Site
 Eisenhower on U.S. Postage stamps
 Eisenhower Presidential Center
 Ike: Countdown to D-Day – a 2004 American television film about the decisions Eisenhower made as Supreme Commander that led to the successful D-Day invasion of World War II
 Pact of Madrid
 People to People Student Ambassador Program
 Pressure – a 2014 British play on Eisenhower's part in the meteorological decisions leading up to D-Day; he was played in the premiere production by Malcolm Sinclair
 Kay Summersby

General:
 Historical rankings of presidents of the United States
 History of the United States (1945–1964)
 List of presidents of the United States by previous experience

References

Bibliography

General biographies 
 
 
 
 
 Krieg, Joann P. ed. (1987). Dwight D. Eisenhower, Soldier, President, Statesman. 24 essays by scholars. 
 , popular history.
 
 
 , popular history

Military career 
 
 
 Eisenhower, David (1986). Eisenhower at War 1943–1945, New York : Random House. . A detailed study by his grandson.
 Eisenhower, John S. D. (2003). General Ike, Free Press, New York. , by his son.
 Hatch, Alden. General Eisenhower (1944) online, early popular biography.
 
 Irish, Kerry E. "Apt Pupil: Dwight Eisenhower and the 1930 Industrial Mobilization Plan", The Journal of Military History 70.1 (2006) 31–61 online in Project Muse.

Civilian career 
 
 
 
 Damms, Richard V. (2002). The Eisenhower Presidency, 1953–1961
 David Paul T., ed. (1954). Presidential Nominating Politics in 1952. 5 vols., Johns Hopkins Press. 
 Divine, Robert A. (1981). Eisenhower and the Cold War.
 Gellman, Irwin F. (2015). The President and the Apprentice: Eisenhower and Nixon, 1952–1961. New Haven, CT: Yale University Press.  
 Greenstein, Fred I. (1991). The Hidden-Hand Presidency: Eisenhower as Leader. Basic Books.  
 Harris, Douglas B. "Dwight Eisenhower and the New Deal: The Politics of Preemption", Presidential Studies Quarterly, Vol. 27, 1997.
 Harris, Seymour E. (1962). The Economics of the Political Parties, with Special Attention to Presidents Eisenhower and Kennedy. 
 
 
 Lasby,  Clarence G. Eisenhower's Heart Attack: How Ike Beat Heart Disease and Held on to the Presidency (1997).
 Mason, Robert. "War Hero in the White House: Dwight Eisenhower and the Politics of Peace, Prosperity, and Party." in Profiles in Power (Brill, 2020) pp. 112–128.
 Medhurst, Martin J. (1993). Dwight D. Eisenhower: Strategic Communicator. Westport, CT: Greenwood Press.  
 Mayer, Michael S. (2009). The Eisenhower Years Facts on File. 
 Newton, Jim. (2011) Eisenhower: The White House Years  
 Pach, Chester J., and Richardson, Elmo (1991). Presidency of Dwight D. Eisenhower. University Press of Kansas.  
 
 
 Watry, David M. (2014). Diplomacy at the Brink: Eisenhower, Churchill and Eden in the Cold War. Baton Rouge, LA: Louisiana State University Press.

General history

Primary sources 
 Boyle, Peter G., ed. (1990). The Churchill–Eisenhower Correspondence, 1953–1955. University of North Carolina Press.
 Boyle, Peter G., ed. (2005). The Eden–Eisenhower correspondence, 1955–1957. University of North Carolina Press. 
 Butcher, Harry C. (1946). My Three Years With Eisenhower The Personal Diary of Captain Harry C. Butcher, USNR, candid memoir by a top aide. online
 Eisenhower, Dwight D. (1948). Crusade in Europe, his war memoirs.
 
 Eisenhower, Dwight D. (1965). The White House Years: Waging Peace 1956–1961, Doubleday and Co.
 Eisenhower Papers 21-volume scholarly edition; complete for 1940–1961.
 Summersby, Kay (1948). Eisenhower Was My Boss, New York: Prentice Hall; (1949) Dell paperback.

External links 

 White House biography
 Eisenhower Presidential Library and Museum
 Eisenhower National Historic Site
 Eisenhower Foundation
 Major speeches of Dwight Eisenhower
 
 Dwight D. Eisenhower: A Resource Guide from the Library of Congress
 Extensive essays on Dwight Eisenhower and shorter essays on each member of his cabinet and First Lady from the Miller Center of Public Affairs
 "Life Portrait of Dwight D. Eisenhower", from C-SPAN's American Presidents: Life Portraits, October 25, 1999
 
 
 

 
1890 births
1969 deaths
20th-century American politicians
20th-century Presbyterians
20th-century presidents of the United States
American anti-communists
American anti-fascists
American five-star officers
American football halfbacks
American people of Pennsylvania Dutch descent
American people of the Korean War
American Presbyterians
Army Black Knights football players
Burials in Kansas
Candidates in the 1952 United States presidential election
Candidates in the 1956 United States presidential election
Carnegie Endowment for International Peace
Companions of the Liberation
Dwight D. Eisenhower School for National Security and Resource Strategy alumni
Dwight D. Eisenhower School for National Security and Resource Strategy
Eisenhower family
Graduates of the United States Military Academy Class of 1915
Grand Croix of the Légion d'honneur
Grand Crosses of the Order of George I with Swords
Grand Crosses of the Order of Polonia Restituta
Grand Crosses of the Order of the Liberator General San Martin
Grand Crosses of the Order of the White Lion
Grand Crosses of the Virtuti Militari
Honorary Knights Grand Cross of the Order of the Bath
Honorary members of the Order of Merit
Kansas Republicans
Knights Grand Cross of the Military Order of Savoy
Knights of the Holy Sepulchre
Military personnel from Kansas
Military personnel from Pennsylvania
Military personnel from Texas
NATO Supreme Allied Commanders
New York (state) Republicans
Pennsylvania Republicans
People from Abilene, Kansas
People from Denison, Texas
People from Gettysburg, Pennsylvania
People of the Cold War
People of the Congo Crisis
People with Crohn's disease
Presidents of Columbia University
Presidents of the United States
Recipients of the Croix de guerre (Belgium)
Recipients of the Croix de Guerre 1939–1945 (France)
Recipients of the Czechoslovak War Cross
Recipients of the Distinguished Service Medal (US Army)
Recipients of the Distinguished Service Star
Recipients of the Grand Decoration with Sash for Services to the Republic of Austria
Recipients of the Legion of Merit
Recipients of the National Order of Merit (Malta)
Recipients of the Navy Distinguished Service Medal
Recipients of the Order of Military Merit (Brazil)
Recipients of the Order of Suvorov, 1st class
Recipients of the Order of the Cross of Grunwald, 1st class
Recipients of the Order of Victory
Recipients of the Order pro Merito Melitensi
Republican Party (United States) presidential nominees
Republican Party presidents of the United States
Residents of Thatched House Lodge
Sons of the American Revolution
St. Mary's Rattlers football coaches
Time Person of the Year
United States Army Chiefs of Staff
United States Army Command and General Staff College alumni
United States Army generals of World War II
United States Army generals
United States Army personnel of World War I
United States Army War College alumni
United States Military Academy alumni
United States military governors
World Golf Hall of Fame inductees
Writers from Kansas
Writers from Pennsylvania
Writers from Texas
Players of American football from Kansas
Coaches of American football from Kansas
United States Army Infantry Branch personnel
Centrism in the United States
Recipients of orders, decorations, and medals of Ethiopia